Kilinochchi Hindu College ( Kiḷinocci Intuk Kallūri) is a provincial school in Kilinochchi, Sri Lanka.

See also
 List of schools in Northern Province, Sri Lanka

References

External links
 
 

Educational institutions established in 1952
Provincial schools in Sri Lanka
Buildings and structures in Kilinochchi
Schools in Kilinochchi District
1952 establishments in Ceylon